Obereopsis endroedii is a species of beetle in the family Cerambycidae. It was described by Stephan von Breuning in 1973. It is known from the Ivory Coast, the Central African Republic, Cameroon, Guinea, Ghana, and Uganda.

References

endroedii
Beetles described in 1973